NRP Vouga was a  built for the Portuguese Navy in the 1910s and early 1920s.

Design

The Portuguese Navy had struggled to secure funding for new ships after the 1890s, when a number of protected cruisers and smaller craft had been built. The navy nevertheless made repeated attempts for ambitious construction programs. After the toppling of the Portuguese monarchy in 1910, the navy submitted another large construction plan in 1912, which the new republican government passed (and then reduced in scope in 1913). The revised plan called for two new cruisers, six destroyers, and three submarines; the Guadiana class of four destroyers comprised a significant part of the program. The design for the new ships was prepared by Yarrow Shipbuilders.

They had a crew of 80 officers and enlisted men. The ships were powered by two Parsons steam turbines, with steam provided by three Yarrow water-tube boilers that were vented through individual funnels.

The ship carried an armament that consisted of a single  gun and two  guns, along with four  torpedo tubes. The 102 mm gun was placed on the forecastle and the 76 mm guns were mounted on the centerline further aft, one between the first and second funnel and the other gun further aft. The torpedo tubes were in twin mounts, also on the centerline, one aft of the third funnel and the other at the stern.

Service history

Vouga was built at the Lisbon Naval Base and was launched on 19 April 1920.

The ship sank accidentally on 1 May 1931.

Notes

References
 
 

Guadiana-class destroyers